Staigue or Staig ( or Caiseal Stéig) is a ruined stone ringfort three miles west of Sneem, on the Iveragh peninsula in County Kerry, Ireland. The fort is thought to have been built during the late Iron Age, probably somewhere between 300 and 400 AD, as a defensive stronghold for a local lord or king.

It is at the head of a valley opening south to the sea, surrounded by a ditch over 8m wide and at present 1.8m deep. The fort's walls are up to 5.5 m (18 ft) high in places, 4 m (13 ft) thick at the bottom and 27.4 m (90 ft) in diameter. The inside is reached through a 1.8m passage roofed with double lintels. Staigue represents a considerable feat in engineering and building. It was built without mortar, using undressed stones. Vertical joints visible in the wall show that gaps were left during the building of the wall to allow access and were filled in later. There is also a tapered, lintelled doorway. Inside is an elaborate network of stairways leading to terraces and corbelled cells in the wall reached by passages.

There is evidence that copper was excavated in the surrounding area and it appears to be a place of worship, an observatory and a place of defence.

References

Buildings and structures in County Kerry
Archaeological sites in County Kerry
National Monuments in County Kerry
Forts in the Republic of Ireland